Santa Stole My Lady is the second studio EP by the American indie rock band Fitz and the Tantrums, released on November 26, 2010 through Dangerbird Records. It was released both digitally and as a special  7" vinyl single.

Track listing
 "Santa Stole My Lady" (Michael Fitzpatrick) – 3:00
 "Darkest Street" (Fitzpatrick, Chris Seefried) – 4:38

Personnel
 Michael Fitzpatrick
 Noelle Scaggs
 Joseph Karnes
 James King
 Jeremy Ruzumna
 John Wicks

References

2010 EPs
Fitz and The Tantrums albums
Albums produced by Chris Seefried